Coxall Knoll is a hill lying on the boundary of Shropshire and Herefordshire, England; it is near Bucknell in Shropshire and Buckton and Coxall in Herefordshire. On the summit is an Iron Age hillfort, a scheduled monument.

Description

There are earthen banks following the contours of the hill; the slopes below have been made steeper by the builders of the fort. These two seem to be additions to the main enclosure.

The main entrance to the fort, on the west side, is defined by inturned banks. The south entrance is at the junction of the east and west enclosures. In the north there are two breaks in the banks.

In the northern enclosure there is a recumbent stone, perhaps dating from the Bronze Age. It is known, because of its shape, as the Frog Stone. There is no trace of a hollow where it might have once stood upright; it may have been placed here by the builders of the fort, or by earlier inhabitants.

References

Scheduled monuments in Shropshire
Hills of Herefordshire
Hills of Shropshire
Hill forts in Shropshire